Bhagawan is a 2004 Kannada action film directed by H. Vasu and written by Dwarki. The film features Darshan and Anjali(Daisy Bopanna) in the lead roles whilst Bhavana and Sai Kumar play other pivotal roles.

The film achieved success and ran 100 days all over Karnataka at few centres. The film featured an original score and soundtrack composed by Rajesh Ramanath.

Cast 
 Darshan as Bhagawan "Bhagi"
 Bhavana as Bobby
 Daisy Bopanna (credited as Anjali) as Nanditha
 Sai Kumar Pudipeddi as Devudu
 Rangayana Raghu as Sharath Simha
 Babloo Prithviraj
 Ayyappa P. Sharma
 Bullet Prakash
 Bank Janardhan
 Jayalakshmi
 Sundar Raj

Soundtrack 
The music was composed by Rajesh Ramanath.

Reception 
A critic from Sify wrote that "If you are a fan of Darshan, go and watch it".

References 

2004 films
2000s Kannada-language films
Indian action films
2004 action films